Jean Diego Moser (born June 23, 1993) is a Brazilian professional footballer who currently plays as a forward for Hong Kong Premier League club Southern.

Club statistics
Updated to 23 February 2016.

References

External links

Profile at Tochigi SC

1993 births
Living people
Brazilian footballers
J2 League players
J3 League players
Hong Kong Premier League players
Zweigen Kanazawa players
Tochigi SC players
Criciúma Esporte Clube players
Yuen Long FC players
Eastern Sports Club footballers
TSW Pegasus FC players
Southern District FC players
Brazilian expatriate footballers
Expatriate footballers in Japan
Expatriate footballers in Hong Kong
Brazilian expatriate sportspeople in Hong Kong
Association football forwards
Hong Kong League XI representative players